Peron (or Perón, Péron) may refer to:

People
Alphonse Péron (1834–1908), French soldier and geologist.
Carlos Perón (born 1952), Swiss musician, founding member of the band Yello
Eva Perón (1919–1952), former Argentine political leader First Lady, Spiritual Leader of the Nation, and head of the Eva Perón Foundation
Isabel Perón (born 1931), former Argentine Vice President and President
Jean-Hervé Péron (born 1949), frontman and bass player of several incarnations of German band "Faust"
Juan Perón (1895–1974), former President of Argentina and founder of the Justicialist Party
François Péron (1775–1810), French naturalist and explorer
Pierre Péron (1905–1988), French artist
Andrea Peron (cyclist, born 1971), Italian former professional road bicycle racer
Andrea Peron (cyclist, born 1988), Italian professional road bicycle racer
Dennis Peron (1945-2018), gay American medical marijuana activist and businessman

Places

Peron Islands, two low laying islands off the west coast of the Northern Territory of Australia
Peron Peninsula, located in the Shark Bay World Heritage site in Western Australia
Peron, Punjab, village in Indian Punjab
Peron, Western Australia, outer southern suburb of Perth
Cape Peron, headland located at the extreme southern end of Cockburn Sound in Western Australia
Cape Peron, headland located in Francois Peron National Park
Péron, Ain, commune in the department of Ain in eastern France

Other
Peron's Tree Frog
An alternative name for the rocoto round chili pepper
Older Peron transgression, warm climatic period

See also
Perron (disambiguation)